Liu Jing (born 30 May 1988) is a Chinese speed skater. She competed in the women's 3000 metres at the 2018 Winter Olympics.

References

1988 births
Living people
Chinese female speed skaters
Olympic speed skaters of China
Speed skaters at the 2018 Winter Olympics
Place of birth missing (living people)
Asian Games medalists in speed skating
Speed skaters at the 2017 Asian Winter Games
Asian Games bronze medalists for China
Medalists at the 2017 Asian Winter Games
20th-century Chinese women
21st-century Chinese women